Ibrahim Amuah Diaky (born May 24, 1982) is an Emirati football player who plays as a midfielder for Al Ain FC since 2013.

Personal life
Diaky was born in Abidjan, Ivory Coast in 1982. He was granted Emirati citizenship in late 2006.

References

External links
 

1982 births
Living people
Al Ain FC players
Al Jazira Club players
Association football midfielders
Emirati footballers
Emirati people of Ivorian descent
Ivorian footballers
Ivory Coast international footballers
Naturalized citizens of the United Arab Emirates
Footballers from Abidjan
UAE Pro League players